Princess Beatrice Bhadrayuvadi (5 December 1876 – 30 September 1913), was a Princess of Siam (later Thailand). She was a member of Siamese Royal Family. She is a daughter of Chulalongkorn.

Her name was given by her father, King Chulalongkorn, in honour of British Queen Victoria's daughter, The Princess Beatrice. Her mother was The Noble Consort (Chao Chom Manda) Saeng Kalyanamitra (daughter of Phraya Jayavichit, son of Chao Phraya Nikara Bodindra (To) who built Kalyanamitra Temple. Princess Beatrice Bhadrayuvadi had 3 full siblings; 2 elder brothers and 1 younger sister;
 Prince Isaravongs Vorarajakumara (4 September 1870 – 5 June 1872)
 Prince Nabhanka Nibandhabongs (8 August 1874 – 17 September 1876)
 Princess Charoensri Chanamayu (31 March 1878 – 24 December 1916)

Princess Beatrice Bhadrayuvadi died 30 September 1913 at age of only 36.

Ancestry

1876 births
1913 deaths
19th-century Thai women
19th-century Chakri dynasty
20th-century Thai women
20th-century Chakri dynasty
Thai female Phra Ong Chao
Dames Grand Commander of the Order of Chula Chom Klao
Children of Chulalongkorn
Daughters of kings